The 25th Assembly District of Wisconsin is one of 99 districts in the Wisconsin State Assembly. Located in eastern Wisconsin, the district comprises central Manitowoc County and part of eastern Calumet County.  It includes all of the cities of Manitowoc and Chilton, as well as the villages of Hilbert, Potter, Reedsville, St. Nazianz, Valders, and Whitelaw.  The district is represented by Republican Paul Tittl, since January 2013.

The 25th Assembly district is located within Wisconsin's 9th Senate district, along with the 26th and 27th Assembly districts.

List of past representatives

References 

Wisconsin State Assembly districts
Calumet County, Wisconsin
Manitowoc County, Wisconsin